Trevor Jamaal Keels (born August 26, 2003) is an American professional basketball player for the New York Knicks of the National Basketball Association (NBA), on a two-way contract with the Westchester Knicks of the NBA G League. He played college basketball for the Duke Blue Devils. Keels was a consensus five-star recruit and one of the top shooting guards in the 2021 class.

High school career
Keels played basketball for Paul VI Catholic High School in Chantilly, Virginia, where he was teammates with his future college teammate Jeremy Roach. As a sophomore, he averaged 15.6 points, 3.9 rebounds and 2.3 assists per game, earning Washington Catholic Athletic Conference (WCAC) Co-Player of the Year honors. In his junior season, Keels led Paul VI to the Virginia Independent Schools Athletic Association Division I state title. As a senior, he averaged 28.7 points, 9.1 rebounds, 7.2 assists and 3.8 steals per game. He was named Virginia Gatorade Player of the Year and was selected to the McDonald's All-American Game, Jordan Brand Classic and Nike Hoop Summit rosters.

Recruiting
Keels received his first NCAA Division I scholarship offer from Wake Forest, three games into his high school career. He finished as a consensus five-star recruit and one of the top shooting guards in the 2021 class. On April 2, 2021, Keels committed to playing college basketball for Duke over offers from Virginia, Villanova and Kentucky.

College career
In his collegiate debut, a 79-71 win against Kentucky, Keels scored 25 points. He averaged 11.5 points, 3.4 rebounds, and 2.7 assists in his first season with Duke. Keels was named to the ACC All-Rookie Team. Following his freshman season, Keels announced his intention to enter the 2022 NBA draft. On June 1, 2022, he announced he would remain in the draft and forego his remaining college eligibility.

Professional career

New York / Westchester Knicks (2022–present)
Keels was selected with the 42nd overall pick by the New York Knicks in the 2022 NBA draft. On July 10, 2022, Keels signed a two-way contract with the Knicks. On February 23, 2023, the Knicks converted his deal to a 10-day contract, which expired on March 5 and he returned to the Westchester Knicks of the NBA G League. On March 13, Keels signed a two-way contract with the New York Knicks.

Career statistics

NBA

|-
| style="text-align:left;"|
| style="text-align:left;"|New York
| 2 || 0 || 2.0 || .333 || .333 ||  || 1.0 || .0 || .0 || .0 || 1.5
|- class="sortbottom"
| style="text-align:center;" colspan="2"|Career
| 2 || 0 || 2.0 || .333 || .333 ||  || 1.0 || .0 || .0 || .0 || 1.5

College

|-
| style="text-align:left;"|2021–22
| style="text-align:left;"|Duke
| 36 || 26 || 30.2 || .419 || .312 || .670 || 3.4 || 2.7 || 1.2 || .1 || 11.5

References

External links

 Duke Blue Devils bio
 USA Basketball bio

2003 births
Living people
American men's basketball players
Basketball players from Maryland
Duke Blue Devils men's basketball players
McDonald's High School All-Americans
New York Knicks draft picks
New York Knicks players
People from Clinton, Maryland
Shooting guards
Westchester Knicks players